Poynings' Law or the Statute of Drogheda may refer to the following  acts of the Parliament of Ireland:
 The acts of Poynings' Parliament, summoned to Drogheda in 1494–5 by Edward Poynings; or more specifically 
 Poynings' Law (on certification of acts), regulated the procedure for passing bills until the Constitution of 1782
 Poynings' Law (confirmation of English statutes), imported to Ireland many prior acts of the Parliament of England

See also
 Poynings (disambiguation)